David Bernard may refer to:

David Bernard (cricketer) (born 1981), West Indian cricketer
David Bernard (conductor) (born 1964), American conductor, pianist and clarinettist
Dave Bernard (American football) (1912–1973), former NFL player
David K. Bernard (born 1956), American theologian
David Bernard (meteorologist) (born 1969), American television meteorologist